The Battle of Tanagra was a battle in the Peloponnesian War in 426 BC between Athens and Tanagra and Thebes.

In 426 Athens sent a fleet to the island of Melos consisting of 60 ships and 2,000 hoplites under the command of Nicias. Melos had refused to join the Delian League, and still refused to do so even when the Athenians plundered the island. The Athenians, however, did not conquer the island, but instead sailed to Oropus on the coast of Boeotia. The hoplites landed on shore and marched towards Tanagra, where they were joined by the main Athenian army that had been marching from Athens under Hipponicus and Eurymedon. They plundered the countryside, and the next day defeated a combined Tanagran and Theban army, but returned to Athens after the victory.

References

426 BC
420s BC conflicts
Tanagra 426 BC
Tanagra 426 BC
Ancient Boeotia
Tanagra 426